Facelinopsis pacodelucia is a species of sea slug, an aeolid nudibranch, a marine gastropod mollusc in the family Facelinidae.

Distribution
This species was described from specimens collected in Algeciras harbour (type locality) and Ceuta, Spain.

Etymology
This species is named as a tribute to flamenco guitarist Paco de Lucía, who was born in Algeciras and died 10 months prior to the publication of the description.

References 

Facelinidae
Gastropods described in 2014